Jhajjar district is one of the 22 districts of Haryana state in northern India. Other towns in the district are Bahadurgarh and Badli and Beri. Bahadurgarh is the major city of the district and state. Bahadurgarh is known as 'The City of Destiny'. Beri used to be a village fifty years ago.

It has two industrial areas with over 3300 industries. Basic industries are ceramics, glass, chemicals, engineering, electrical and electronics. Bahadurgarh is the major Industrial area of the district with over 2800 medium size industries and 200 large-scale industries. There are 3300 units representing a total investment of Rs. 40000 million. Major crops grown here are rice, wheat and maize.

Jhajjar is said to have been founded by Chhaju Jat as Chhajunagar, which was later changed to Jhajjar. Alternatively, it may be derived from Jharnaghar, meaning a natural fountain or Jhajjar, a water vessel, because the surface drainage of the country for miles around runs into the town as into a sink. Bahadurgarh, founded by Rathee Jats, was formerly known as Sharafabad.

Demographics

 Jhajjar district had a population of 958,405, roughly equal to the nation of Fiji or the US state of Montana. This gives it a ranking of 456th in India (out of a total of 640). Its population growth rate over the decade 2001-2011 was 8.73%. Jhajjar has a sex ratio of 782 females for every 1000 males, and a literacy rate of 80.8%. Scheduled Castes make up 17.78% of the population.

Jat is the dominant caste in the district. According to census 2011 Jhajjar city has a population of 48,424, Beri has 15,934, and the major city of the district Bahadurgarh has 170,767.

In the 2011 National Census, it was found that Jhajjar district has the lowest sex ratio in India of the 0-6 group, with just 782 girls to 1,000 boys. Two villages in Jhajjar have extremely low gender-ratios: Bahrana and Dimana have gender ratios of 378 girls to 1,000 boys and 444 girls to 1,000 boys respectively. In Jhajjar, parents are able to illegally learn the gender of the fetus through secret early morning ultrasounds at registered clinics and through the use of code-words, Ladoo for boy and Jalebi for girl; these families often go on to abort female fetuses.

Religion

Languages 

At the time of the 2011 Census of India, 73.88% of the population in the district spoke Haryanvi and 24.00% Hindi as their first language.

Divisions 
Jhajjar district is divided into 4 sub-divisions: Jhajjar, Bahadurgarh, Badli and Beri. Jhajjar sub-division comprises two tehsils: Jhajjar and Matanhail. Bahadurgarh sub-division comprises only one tehsil, Bahadurgarh. Badli and Beri sub-division also comprises only one tehsil each.

There are four Haryana Vidhan Sabha constituencies in this district: Bahadurgarh, Badli, Jhajjar and Beri. All of these are part of Rohtak Lok Sabha constituency.

Industries
Bahadurgarh, known as 'The City of Destiny', is the major industrial estate of the district. Bahadurgarh alone covers 3,000 industries out of 3,300 total industries in district. Basic industries are ceramics, glass, chemicals, engineering, electrical and electronics.

SSI & MSI units

In Jhajjar District. there are 1818 SSI (Small Scale Industries) units registered as of 31 December 2000. The total approximate investment of these units is 9550.01 lakhs and total employment in these units is 12153. In 2016, there are 3050 SSI or MSI in Jhajjar district, out of which Bahadurgarh alone have 2800 MSI (Medium Size Industries).

LSI units
There are over 250 LSI in the District in 2016 which are engaged in the manufacturing. Out of these 250 LSI (Large Scale Industries), 200 are in Bahadurgarh.

Notable people
 

Manjul Bhardwaj (born 1969), actor, director, writer and facilitator

See also

 Bahadurgarh
 Rohtak
 Beri
 Gurgaon

References

External links 
 Official website

 
Districts of Haryana
1997 establishments in Haryana